Transfiguration Church of the St. Euphrosine monastery in Polotsk, Belarus is a unique monument of Pre-Mongol Rus architecture. Built in the 12th century, it was reconstructed in the 17th and the 19th centuries. Despite the reconstructions, the church has preserved the original Medieval frescoes.

History

Architecture

The church was constructed in the middle of the 1150s. Manuscripts about Euphrosyne of Polotsk mention that some ‘Ivan, head of church builders’ was the architect.

The sixbased square church has one apse a dynamic vertical silhouette. To further emphasize it, the zakomaras,  and Kokoshniks are styled in long vertical shapes, while the side naves are narrowed.

In the 17th to 19th centuries the roof was rebuilt. In the 1830s the church dilapidated, but the contemporaries understood its high historical value and restored it.

Frescoes 
The researchers date the frescoes to the early 12th century; most likely, the church was painted between 1133 and 1145 by order of Euphrosyne of Polotsk. She is also believed to be the author of the layout of the paintings. The art style clearly demonstrates traces of the Byzantine ancestry, however, the artists could also be influenced by the Romanesque art. The 12th century frescoes are uniquely intact and well-preserved. The paintings include images of the Orans, Nativity of Jesus, Flight into Egypt, etc. There are also some rare scenes like ‘St Anthony and centaur’.

During the restoration of the 19th century new frescoes were painted in 1835 and 1884. Modern restotators in 2006-2017 managed to save both layers, they extracted the younger frescoes and transferred them to a new base. The 19th century frescoes nowadays are displayed in the Art Gallery of the Polotsk National History and Art Museum.

The contemporary researchers also discovered numerous valuable examples of Medieval literacy - the graffiti, written on the walls, altar, stairs and other parts of the church. The writings belong to five different historical periods and vary in purpose. There are commemorations, autographs, clerical and educational texts, even everyday notes and penancies.

Contemporary Research 
In 2015 the archeologists discovered underground galleries and an exonarthex. Even more, a whole underground church was found at 3 meters depth. Presumably, Euphrosyne’s father  was buried there. The hidden church has its own altar, its walls and ceiling were decorated with frescoes.

During the excavations, the archeologists found more than 10.000 pieces of frescoes and miscellaneous objects such as a part of horace, mosaics and floor tiles, a lead roofing sheet, a stamp for Euphrosyne’s personal seal. Among other artifacts, the archeologists found a piece of plinthiform brick with the construction scheme of the church. The unexpected discovery is a dollar coin of the 1920s.

References

Sources 

 

Architecture in Belarus
Buildings and structures in Polotsk
Eastern Orthodox church buildings in Belarus